The 1954–55 season was the 52nd season of competitive football in Belgium. RSC Anderlechtois won their 6th Division I title and thus became the first Belgian club to enter European competitions as the European Champion Clubs' Cup was first played in 1955-56. The Belgium national football team played 6 friendly games (2 wins, 1 draw, 3 losses). The first Belgian Golden Shoe was awarded in 1955 for the best Belgian played during the 1954 year. Henri Coppens of R Beerschot AC won the trophy.

Overview
At the end of the season, RRC de Bruxelles and OC Charleroi were relegated to Division II and were replaced by Division II winner R Daring Club de Bruxelles and runner-up K Beeringen FC.
The bottom 2 clubs in Division II (KFC Izegem and RRC de Gand) were relegated to Division III while both Division III winners (KFC Herentals and RRC Tournaisien) qualified for Division II.
The bottom 2 clubs of each Division III league were relegated to Promotion: K Patria FC Tongeren, Stade Waremmien FC, KVG Oostende and K Sint-Niklaasse SK, to be replaced by Mol Sport, SCUP Jette, RCS Hallois and KVK Waaslandia Burcht from Promotion.

National team

* Belgium score given first

Key
 H = Home match
 A = Away match
 N = On neutral ground
 F = Friendly
 o.g. = own goal

Honours

Final league tables

Premier Division

 1954-55 Top scorer: Henri Coppens (R Beerschot AC) with 35 goals.
 1954 Golden Shoe: Henri Coppens (R Beerschot AC)

References